Acanthaceae is a family (the acanthus family) of dicotyledonous flowering plants containing almost 250 genera and about 2500 species. Most are tropical herbs, shrubs, or twining vines; some are epiphytes. Only a few species are distributed in temperate regions. The four main centres of distribution are Indonesia and Malaysia, Africa, Brazil, and Central America. Representatives of the family can be found in nearly every habitat, including dense or open forests, scrublands, wet fields and valleys, sea coast and marine areas, swamps, and mangrove forests.

Description
Plants in this family have simple, opposite, decussated leaves with entire (or sometimes toothed, lobed, or spiny) margins, and without stipules. The leaves may contain cystoliths, calcium carbonate concretions, seen as streaks on the surface.

The flowers are perfect, zygomorphic to nearly actinomorphic, and arranged in an inflorescence that is either a spike, raceme, or cyme. Typically, a colorful bract subtends each flower; in some species, the bract is large and showy. The calyx usually has four or five lobes; the corolla tubular, two-lipped or five-lobed; stamens number either two or four, arranged in pairs and inserted on the corolla, and the ovary is superior and bicarpellated, with axile placentation.

The fruit is a two-celled capsule, dehiscing somewhat explosively. In most species, the seeds are attached to a small, hooked stalk (a modified funiculus called a jaculator or a retinaculum) that ejects them from the capsule. This trait is shared by all members of the clade Acanthoideae. A 1995 study of seed expulsion in Acanthaceae used high speed video pictures to show that retinacula propel seeds away from the parent plant when the fruits dehisce, thereby helping the plant gain maximum seed dispersal range.

A species well known to temperate gardeners is bear's breeches (Acanthus mollis), a herbaceous perennial plant with big leaves and flower spikes up to 2 m tall. Tropical genera familiar to gardeners include Thunbergia and Justicia.

Avicennia, a genus of mangrove trees, usually placed in Verbenaceae or in its own family, Avicenniaceae, is included in Acanthaceae by the Angiosperm Phylogeny Group on the basis of molecular phylogenetic studies that show it to be associated with this family.

Medicinal uses
Traditionally the most important part use in Acanthaceae is the leaves and they are used externally for wounds.
Some research has indicated that Acanthaceae possess antifungal, cytotoxic, anti-inflammatory, anti-pyretic, antioxidant, insecticidal, hepatoprotective, immunomodulatory, anti-platelet aggregation and anti-viral potential.

For instance, Acanthus ilicifolius, whose chemical composition has been heavily researched, is widely used in ethnopharmaceutical applications, including in Indian and Chinese traditional medicine. Various parts of Acanthus ilicifolius have been used to treat asthma, diabetes, leprosy, hepatitis, snake bites, and rheumatoid arthritis. The leaves of Acanthus ebracteatus, noted for their antioxidant properties, are used for making Thai herbal tea in Thailand and Indonesia.

Phytochemistry
Phytochemical reports on family Acanthaceae are glycosides, flavonoids, benzonoids, phenolic compounds, naphthoquinone and triterpenoids.

Overview of systematics 
Since the first comprehensive classification of Acanthaceae in 1847 by Nees, there have been a few major revisions presented since for the whole family.

Lindau, in 1895, divided the family into the subfamilies Mendoncioideae, Thunbergioideae, Nelsonioideae, and Acanthoideae. Critically, Mendoncioideae, Thunbergioideae, and Nelsonioideae do not possess retinaculate fruits—and it is this distinction, between classifying Acanthaceae into a family that includes those clades with non-retinaculate fruits and one that excludes them, that still persists to the modern day.

Bremekamp, in 1965, presented a classification of Acanthaceae that differed from that of Lindau, for his Acanthaceae excluded genera that lack retinaculate fruits. He placed Nelsonioideae within Scrophulariaceae, classified Thunbergiaceae and Mendonciaceae as distinct families and divided his Acanthaceae into two groups (Acanthoideae and Ruelloideae) based on the presence or absence of cystoliths, articulate stems, monothecate anthers, and colpate pollen.

In Scotland and Vollesen's 2000 study, they accepted 221 genera and detailed five major groups within Acanthaceae s.s. (that is, those possessing retinaculate fruits), which is equivalent to Acanthoideae Link sensu Lindau 1895. Out of those 221 genera, they placed 201 of them into seven infrafamilial taxa of Acanthaceae, leaving only 20 unplaced.

In the current understanding of Acanthaceae, Acanthaceae s.s. includes only those clades with retinaculate fruits (that is, Acantheae, Barlerieae, Andrographideae, Whitfieldeae, Ruellieae, and Justiceae), while Acanthaceae s.l. includes those clades as well as Thunbergioideae, Nelsonioideae, and Avicennia.

Dating the Acanthaceae lineage 
Much research, using both molecular data and fossils, has been conducted in recent years regarding the dating and distribution of the Acanthaceae and Lamiales lineage, although there still remains some ambiguity.

In a 2004 study on the molecular phylogenetic dating of asterid flowering plants, researchers estimated 106 million years (MY) for the stem lineage of Lamiales, 67 MY for the stem lineage of Acanthaceae, and 54 MY for the crown node of Acanthaceae (that is, the age of extant lineages with the family). These estimates are older than those based on fossils that can confidently be assigned to Lamiales, which are middle Eocene in age, ca. 48-37 MY. Palynomorphs that definitively show the existence of Acanthaceae are known from the upper Miocene, with the oldest ca. 22 MY.

Selected genera

, the Germplasm Resources Information Network accepts 217 genera, while 206 accepted genera are listed by Plants of the World Online (the Royal Botanic Gardens, Kew).

Excluded genera
 Thomandersia Baill. → Thomandersiaceae

References

External links

 Tree of Life Acanthaceae
 Family Acanthaceae Flowers in Israel.
 Acanthaceae in BoDD – Botanical Dermatology Database

 
Lamiales families